The South Adelaide Football Club is an Australian rules football club that competes in the South Australian National Football League (SANFL). Known as the Panthers, their home ground is Flinders University Stadium (formerly Noarlunga Oval), located in Noarlunga Downs in the southern suburbs of Adelaide.

The Panthers have won 11 SANFL premierships, their last being in 1964. Recently, South Adelaide won back-to-back SANFLW premierships in 2018 and 2019. The club also participated in the Leagues Championship Cup. 

South Adelaide Football Club is the owner of South Adelaide Netball Club and South Adelaide Volleyball Club, with all three clubs now under the Panthers brand. The partnership between these clubs is seen as an initiative to establish South Adelaide as the sporting hub for the southern community.

History

Club Formation and Early Days

The South Adelaide Football Club is one of the two surviving original members of the South Australian Football Association formed 30 April 1877  still competing in the SANFL, and has held its original colours (which were originally blue caps and long white trousers) longer than any other and has competed in every single season. South Adelaide Football Club was formed in 1876 as a breakaway club from the Old Adelaide Football Club. After a meeting in the Draper Memorial Schoolrooms a secretarial position for the club was filled by Charles Cameron Kingston.

The club played their first game on 20 May 1876 against the Victorian Club at Montefiore Hill which started at 3pm. After some hard work and several disputes over the rules of the game it ceased 2 hours later after the Victorians scored a goal. South Adelaide was joint SAFA Club Champions along with the Victorians in the inaugural SAFA season of 1877.

Golden Era of Success
Between 1885 and 1900 South Adelaide won seven premierships (1885, 1892, 1893, 1895, 1896, 1898 and 1899) and was runner-up eight times between 1881 and 1903 (1881, 1882, 1886, 1894, 1897, 1900, 1902, 1903).

South Adelaide was led from 1888 to 1898 by captain and "proto-coach" Dinny Reedman who is generally seen as the first to view team combination and planning as a critical component of success in football. In 1896 they won sixteen and drew two of eighteen games.

Decline after District Football

District football was introduced optionally in 1897 and became compulsory in 1899. This was difficult for South Adelaide, who had under Reedman obtained most of its top players from Christian Brothers College, and even in 1899 when it won its sixth premiership in eight years half its side came therefrom. With the loss of Reedman and Jones to North Adelaide, and after one season goalsneak "Bos" Daly to West Torrens in 1900, the blue and whites declined steadily. This was exacerbated by the admission of Sturt in 1901. South Adelaide was runner-up in 1903 to Port Adelaide, but won only 26 and drew two of 108 games between 1906 and 1914, including a winless season in 1909 and two consecutive one-win seasons (both wins by less than a goal) in 1910 and 1911. In 1915, South improved to second before lack of finals experience took its toll in the semi-final.

Following an enforced halt to SAFL football during World War I, the presence of champion defender Dan Moriarty made South highly competitive between 1919 and 1924, though it never rose above third in 1921. However, after his retirement South took four consecutive wooden spoons from 1926 to 1929 and did not finish above sixth in an eight-team competition between 1925 and 1934, winning only thirty and drawing three of 160 games. It was generally known that South had an unfairly small share of the area zoned between eight league clubs, but the league committee refused to alter the status quo.

Brief Halcyon and Abrupt Fall
In response to South Adelaide's limited metropolitan recruiting resources, the club began a concerted country recruiting campaign during the 1930s. This bore spectacular fruit between 1935 and 1940. Under coach Vic Johnson, South Adelaide after a slow start played impressive football throughout 1935 and ultimately upset Port Adelaide for its first premiership since 1899. Jack Cockburn at centre half-back was the team's star and won the Magarey Medal. After two more seasons in the finals, South Adelaide reached a high point in 1938, losing only two games and swamping Port Adelaide with a 13-goal third quarter in the Grand Final. Led by Clem Rosewarne, Max Murdy and Len Lapthorne, South averaged an amazing 132 points per game, and even without Rosewarne their attack remained extremely potent in 1939 and 1940, averaging 125 points over the minor round. The blue and whites failed badly in the 1939 finals, but won two finals before losing to Sturt in 1940.

1941 saw South slip to fifth with only six wins, but that could hardly have prepared them for the experiences of the two decades after full-scale football resumed after World War II. Between 1947 and 1951 South won only seven games out of eighty-six, and from 1945 to 1963 South never won more than six games in a season, nor finished above any rival except Glenelg and Sturt. Other clubs with greater financial resources duplicated South's 1930s country recruiting campaigns and the club turned over coaches at an extraordinary rate. Eight coaches were employed in nine seasons from 1953 to 1961: even a spell by Port Adelaide legend "Fos" Williams in 1960 failed to raise them above second last, and neither did the adoption of the club's current nickname "The Panthers" in 1957

Kerley and Another Decline
In 1959, after doubting whether the club was viable as a league team, the SANFL granted South Adelaide a substantial area of newly developing southern Adelaide suburbs. During the early 1960s it became apparent that South Adelaide, though only marginally better statistically than the dreadful late 1940s and early 1950s teams, was possessed of enough talent to move beyond the bottom couple of placings. In 1963, South Adelaide sought the services of proven West Adelaide player/coach Neil Kerley after he was controversially sacked by the Bloods, and despite being sceptical Kerley did accept and put the team on an intense training schedule during the 1963/1964 off-season.

South Adelaide rose rapidly in 1964, losing only three minor round games before defeating Port Adelaide by 27 points in the Grand Final. It remained prominent for the remaining two years of Kerley's stint but failed to make the grand final. However, under champion player Peter Darley as captain-coach the Panthers declined very quickly owing to the loss of key followers Kerley and David Kantilla, winning only two games in 1969 for another wooden spoon and not improving until another renowned coach in Haydn Bunton, Jr. took over the reins in 1975. Under Bunton, the Panthers, playing fast, skilful football firmly rooted in the South "tradition", contested the major round for the first time in eleven years in 1977 and reached the Grand Final in 1979. However, on an appallingly windy day and muddy ground the experienced Port Adelaide, aided by winning the toss, were too good, winning 9-9 (63) to 3-14 (32). The Panthers fluctuated in yo-yo fashion under Bunton, never playing in two consecutive finals series before he departed to return to Subiaco after a sabbatical at the end of 1982.

Noarlunga
In 1979, South Adelaide's recruiting zone in the southern suburbs was extended to cover all the developing areas around O‘Halloran Hill, giving the club a potential community base for the first time in its long history. It continued to play at Adelaide Oval until 1994 (the oval was ironically located on the northern side of the City of Adelaide and River Torrens), and its fortunes fluctuated, with two unsuccessful finals appearances under future Adelaide Crows coach Graham Cornes in 1983 and 1984 being followed by free-fall under the coaching of former  (VFL) ruckman Don Scott and Sturt champion full forward Rick Davies to a wooden spoon in 1987. South was under severe pressure to enter into a merger with another SANFL club, but was argued that if South made the long-proposed move to Noarlunga it would be able to capture expanding suburbs in the future.

Under John Reid, South developed rapidly after a one-win season and twenty-six successive losses during 1988 and early 1989. After this disastrous losing streak, South rose to contest each SANFL finals series between 1990 and 1992, with a minor premiership in 1991 the highlight, the Panthers being bundled out by West Adelaide in the Preliminary Final. However, the Panthers have been a disappointment in the two decades since the formation of the Adelaide Crows in 1991, with fourth-place finishes in 2006 and 2011 its highest placings, and some dubious coaching changes such as the sacking of former  coach Ken Sheldon in 1996, and briefly employing seventy-one-year-old veteran John Cahill during 2008. After this, the Panthers won only four games in the 2009 and 2010 seasons for their worst two-season record since the dark days of 1950 and 1951.

Three South Australian Premiers have had a close association with the South Adelaide Football Club: Charles Cameron Kingston (Premier 1893–1899), Dean Brown (1993-96) and Mike Rann (2002-2011). Kingston played for South Adelaide, Dean Brown became Patron and Mike Rann was Number One Ticket Holder.  During his Premiership Rann presented the club with a 100-year peppercorn lease over the Noarlunga Oval site owned by the State Government in what he described as 'land rights for the Panthers'. The club presented the Premier with 100 peppercorns.

South Adelaide entered a team in the SANFL Women's League in 2018. In their short history fielding a women's team, they have become the most successful team in the competition, winning back-to-back premierships in 2018/19.

Home Grounds
Adelaide Oval (1882-1903, 1905-94)
Jubilee Oval (1904)
Flinders University Stadium (1995-present)

In 1969 South Road Recreation Ground at St Marys, South Australia later renamed Panther Park was earmarked to be South's new home ground with plans to build a grandstand but only the change rooms were built and it was used as a training base and for South's junior teams. South Adelaide's clubrooms were based at Panther Park but home games continued to be played at Adelaide Oval until 1995 when the club moved to Noarlunga and its new ground Flinders University Stadium (then called Noarlunga Oval). With the exception of 1904 when they played at the now defunct Jubilee Oval, the Panthers played all their home games at the Adelaide Oval (ironically located on the northern side of the Adelaide city centre) while in 1992 and 1993 they played two games at the Bice Oval in the southern suburb of Christies Beach to gauge support in the area for the Panthers. The oval, located only 1 km from where Hickinbotham Oval now sits, was packed to capacity in 1993 with approximately 8,000 crammed in to see South take on “local” rival Glenelg. It was following this game that the South Adelaide Football Club made the decision to move permanently to Noarlunga.

South Adelaide christened their new home at Noarlunga in Round 8 of the 1995 SANFL season. The opening game at Noarlunga also saw the ground record crowd of 10,123 when Glenelg defeated the Panthers by 47 points. Originally called Noarlunga Oval, the name was officially changed to Hickinbotham Oval in 2005 to honour former Panther and successful property developer, the late Alan Hickinbotham.

In late 2010 the South Adelaide Football Club obtained permission from the City of Onkaparinga to install four light towers at the oval with the intent to host night SANFL games at the venue. Unlike other SANFL grounds which had lights installed, Hickenbotham Oval is not surrounded by housing and permission to build the lights was easily obtained as they were ruled to have minimal impact on the local residents. The first game played under lights on 9 April 2011 saw South defeat North Adelaide in front of 2,630. The record night attendance at the oval was set just a few weeks later in Round 4 of the 2011 SANFL season when 2,700 saw the clash between the Panthers and Port Adelaide.

Club records
Record Attendance at Hickinbotham Oval: 10,123 v Glenelg in Round 8, 1995
Record Night Attendance at Hickinbotham Oval: 2,700 v Port Adelaide in Round 4, 2011
Record Attendance at Adelaide Oval (minor round): 30,618 v Port Adelaide in Round 2, 1965
Record Attendance: 56,353 v Port Adelaide at Adelaide Oval, 1964 SANFL Grand Final
Record Attendance at AAMI Stadium: 50,428 v Port Adelaide, 1979 SANFL Grand Final
Most Games: 337 by Stuart Palmer (1969–85)
Most Goals in a Season: 115 by Chris Munro in 1935
Most Goals for the club: 393 by Chris Munro (1928–30, 1932–37)
Most Years as Coach: 8 by Haydn Bunton, Jr. (1975–82)
Most Years as Captain: 11 by Jack Reedman (1888–98)
Most Premierships as Captain: 5 by Jack Reedman (1892, 1893, 1895, 1896, 1898)
SANFL Leading Goal Kicker: R Wardrop (1882), Alf Bushby (1887), Jack Kay (1896, 1898, 1902), S Scott (1945), Danny Del-Re (1995), Michael Wundke (2011, 2013), Brett Eddy (2016)
SANFL Ken Farmer Medallists: Danny Del-Re (1995), Michael Wundke (2011)
Most Best & Fairest Awards: 7 by Peter Darley (1963, 1964, 1966, 1967, 1968, 1972, 1973)
Highest Score: 39.16 (250) v Woodville 19.14 (128) at Football Park in Round 14, 1984

Club song
The current club song is based on Lily of Laguna, which is the same tune the Carlton Football Club's song is based on. 

The original club song contained the following lyrics and was based on an original tune;

Current playing lists

Men's

Women's

Honours

Club

Individual

Magarey Medallists 

Frank Barry (1915)
Dan Moriarty (1919, 1920, 1921)
Jack Cockburn (1935)
Jim Deane (1953, 1957 – awarded retrospectively)
Mark Naley (1991)
Andrew Osborn (1998)
Joel Cross (2012)
Joel Cross (2015)

All-Australians 
Peter Darley 1969
Mark Naley 1986

League top goalkickers

'Greatest Team' 
The South Adelaide Team of the Century is officially called the 'Greatest Team'.

Honour board

Players

Notable players and coaches

Source: http://australianfootball.com/clubs/stats/South+Adelaide/320

See also 
 :Category:South Adelaide Football Club players

References

External links 

 

South Australian National Football League clubs
SANFL Women's League
Australian rules football clubs in South Australia
1876 establishments in Australia
Australian rules football clubs established in 1876